Joseph Vincent Brennan (born March 20, 1954) is a prelate of the Roman Catholic Church who has been serving as bishop of the Diocese of Fresno in California since 2019. He previously served as an auxiliary bishop of the Archdiocese of Los Angeles from 2015 to 2019.

Early years
Joseph Brennan was born on March 20, 1954, in Van Nuys, California. He was ordained a priest for the Archdiocese of Los Angeles by Cardinal Timothy Manning on June 21, 1980. After his ordination, Brennan served as associate pastor at three parishes in Southern California: Immaculate Heart of Mary Parish in Los Angeles, St. Linus in Norwalk, and the former Cathedral of St. Vibiana in Los Angeles. Brennan was later a pastor at two parishes, returning to St. Linus in Norwalk and Holy Trinity in San Pedro.

Brennan also served as the moderator of the curia for the archdiocese.  In this role, he was in residence at the Cathedral of Our Lady of the Angels and at Mother of Sorrows Catholic Parish. Brennan also served as the vicar general for the archdiocese. Brennan was also a chaplain for the Knights of Columbus in California, a member of the Council of Priests and the College of Consultors of the archdiocese, and also sits on the Board of the Catholic Education Foundation, the Williams Charitable Trust, and Together in Mission.

Auxiliary Bishop of Los Angeles 

Brennan was appointed by Pope Francis as titular bishop of Trofimiana and auxiliary bishop of the Archdiocese of Los Angeles on July 21, 2015. He was ordained by Archbishop José Gómez on September 8, 2015. Gómez made him his episcopal vicar for the San Fernando Pastoral Region.

Bishop of Fresno
On March 5, 2019, Brennan was named bishop of the Diocese of Fresno by Francis. He was installed on May 2, 2019.

Views

Abortion
Brennan opposes abortion rights for women. When Archbishop Salvatore J. Cordileone announced that Speaker of the House of Representatives Nancy Pelosi was prohibited from receiving communion in the Archdiocese of San Francisco, Brennan supported the decision.

Unions
In August 2022, Brennan marched with farm workers in support of the Agricultural Labor Relations Voting Choice Act, that allows for farm workers to use mail-in ballots for union elections.

See also

 Roman Catholic Archdiocese of Los Angeles
 Catholic Church hierarchy
 Catholic Church in the United States
 Historical list of the Catholic bishops of the United States
 List of Catholic bishops of the United States
 Lists of patriarchs, archbishops, and bishops

References

External links

Roman Catholic Diocese of Fresno Official Site
Roman Catholic Archdiocese of Los Angeles Official Site

 

1954 births
Living people
People from Los Angeles
21st-century Roman Catholic bishops in the United States
21st-century American Roman Catholic titular bishops
Bishops appointed by Pope Francis